All Nite Grind is the third EP by American rapper Mr. Envi'. The EP was released on March 31, 2017, by his record label Southern Stisles Records. The EP features guest appearances from Young Bleed, Chucky Workclothes, Syke Pachino and more.

Background
On January 5, 2017, Mr. Envi' announced the release of the second installment of his two part EP series. The EP was supported by the singles "3 Stripes" and "Can't See Me". In an interview with Illuminati 2G, Mr. Envi' stated that he'd release music videos for both singles, with the "3 Stripes" video releasing in February 2017 and "Can't See Me" in mid March.

Track listing

References

Mr. Envi' albums
2017 EPs
Self-released EPs